Karina Longworth (born July 10, 1980) is an American film critic, author, and journalist based in Los Angeles. Longworth writes, hosts and produces the podcast You Must Remember This, about the "secret and/or forgotten histories of Hollywood's first century".

Education 
Longworth received a BFA in Film and a Master of Arts in Cinema Studies from the San Francisco Art Institute.

Writing 
She is one of the founders of the film culture blog Cinematical and formerly edited both Cinematical and the film blog SpoutBlog and, while living in New York, was heard regularly on the Public Radio International show The Takeaway. From 2010 to 2012, she was the Film Editor and lead critic at LA Weekly.

Longworth has contributed to numerous magazines, including New York Magazine, Filmmaker, Time Out New York, Cineaste, and Las Vegas Weekly, as well as the online publications Slate, IndieWire, The Daily Beast, HuffPost, The Village Voice, and Vanity Fair's Little Gold Men blog.

Internet film criticism vs. print film criticism 
When she was still a web critic for SpoutBlog, Longworth appeared in the documentary For the Love of Movies: The Story of American Film Criticism, explaining the virtues of blogging – for creating a back-and-forth dialogue with readers. About blogging she went on to say, "I have a Master's Degree in Film Studies, but I’m no more qualified to blog than a high school student in Vermont." The New York Times has called Longworth "freakishly smart", and Variety said, "... it's the ever-proliferating bloggers – Spout, Cinematical, Movie City News and Hollywood Elsewhere – that have become the instant barometers for how a film plays."

In 2007, Variety said, "As the pool of well-paid print critics shrinks in size, the next generation of film fans may come to trust critic/bloggers like …  Spout's Karina Longworth, who helped to create the major film blog Cinematical". The New York Times has commented, "Are print critics really so all-important and sacrosanct with the Web full of debates about all manner of film in places like indiewire.com, cinematical.com and blog.spout.com?"

You Must Remember This podcast
In April 2014, Longworth launched You Must Remember This, a podcast that covers lesser-known Hollywood stories from the early- to mid-twentieth century.  Distributed by the Panoply network in association with Slate Magazine, there have been 189 episodes so far, all written and narrated by Longworth.  It has become one of the top film podcasts; the Washington Post called it "knowledgeable and laceratingly funny". Podcast Magazine gave the show five out of five mics. The show won the 2016 award for "TV & Film" at the Academy of Podcasters Awards and was a finalist in the 2017. The podcast's most talked about series to date was adapted from the unfinished memoir of Academy Award nominated production designer and film producer Polly Platt.

Personal life 
Longworth was born to a British father and an American Jewish mother. She married director Rian Johnson in 2018. She received a special thanks in the credits of Johnson's film Knives Out.

Works

 The Portable SpoutBlog: Rants, reviews and reports from the film blog edited by Karina Longworth (2009), 
 Masters of Cinema: George Lucas (2012), 
 Al Pacino: Anatomy of an Actor (2013), 
 Meryl Streep: Anatomy of an Actor (2014), 
 Hollywood Frame By Frame: The Unseen Silver Screen in Contact Sheets, 1951-1977 (2014), 
 Seduction: Sex, Lies, and Stardom in Howard Hughes's Hollywood (2018),

See also 

 List of history podcasts

References

External links
 
 
 
 
 
 
 

American film critics
American women podcasters
American podcasters
Jewish American journalists
Jewish American writers
21st-century American women writers
Place of birth missing (living people)
School of the Art Institute of Chicago alumni
San Francisco Art Institute alumni
Tisch School of the Arts alumni
Living people
1980 births
American women journalists
American women film critics
21st-century American journalists
21st-century American non-fiction writers
American women non-fiction writers
21st-century American Jews